James Andrew Phillips is an associate professor of philosophy at the University of New South Wales. He is known for his research on philosophy of art, the philosophy of film and performance, and Martin Heidegger's thought.

Life
After receiving his MA in Comparative Literature and Critical Theory from Monash University, he studied as a Ph.D. student in philosophy in both Austria and Germany and finished his doctorate under Jeff Malpas at the University of Tasmania. Phillips has been a visiting fellow at the Institute of Advanced Studies in the Humanities (University of Edinburgh) and National Humanities Center in North Carolina.

Bibliography
 Phillips JA, and JR Severn, (eds.), 2021, Barrie Kosky's Transnational Theatres, Springer.
 Phillips JA, 2019, Sternberg and Dietrich: The Phenomenology of Spectacle, Oxford University Press
 Phillips JA, (ed.), 2008, Cinematic Thinking, Stanford University Press, Stanford
 Phillips JA, 2007, The Equivocation of Reason: Kleist reading Kant, Stanford University Press
 Phillips JA, 2005, Heidegger`s Volk: Between National Socialism and Poetry, Stanford University Press
 Phillips JA, 2009, 'Beckett's Boredom', in Essays on Boredom and Modernity, edn. 1, Rodopi, Amsterdam

See also
Martin Heidegger and Nazism

References

External links
 James Phillips at UNSW

21st-century Australian philosophers
Academic staff of the University of New South Wales
Continental philosophers
Living people
Political philosophers
Phenomenologists
Heidegger scholars
Philosophers of art
University of Tasmania alumni
Monash University alumni
Film theorists
Critical theorists
Year of birth missing (living people)